Mottisfont railway station served the village of Mottisfont, Hampshire, England, from 1865 to 1964 on the Sprat and Winkle Line.

History
The station was opened on 6 March 1865 on the London and South Western Railway. It closed on 7 September 1964.

References

Disused railway stations in Hampshire
Former London and South Western Railway stations
Beeching closures in England
Railway stations in Great Britain opened in 1865
Railway stations in Great Britain closed in 1964
1865 establishments in England
1964 disestablishments in England